This list contains only complete, printed English-language editions of The Hobbit by J. R. R. Tolkien. It is not for derived or unprinted works such as screenplays, graphic novels, or audio books.

Introduction
For this list, a printing is a separate edition if any of the following criteria is met:
 The publisher declares it to be a new edition.
 Substantial changes to the text have been introduced beyond correcting typographical errors.
 A publisher prints the basic design for the first time.
 The dust jacket or cover design has changed appreciably.
 The height or width of the book has changed.
 The binding materials have changed.

For this list, a printing is a variant of a separate edition if both it is not a separate edition itself and also any of the following criteria is met:
 Inconspicuous marks or annotations declare it to be from a different publisher than an edition it is otherwise identical to (e.g., book club edition).
 Some internal illustrations appear as color instead of black-and-white, or vice versa.
 Some small change has been made in the design of the book or its binding or dust jacket without affecting the whole design.

A printing is 'not' a separate edition or variant solely because of any of the following:
 Binding color changed.
 Dust jacket color scheme changed but design remained the same.
 Typographical errors were corrected.

Numbered pages means the page number of the last page of the story itself, regardless of whether the page number actually appears on the page. It does not include end papers or advertisement pages, even if they are numbered.

List of editions

Early American editions

The early United States editions of The Hobbit were published by the Houghton Mifflin Company of Boston and New York City and are particularly collectible but difficult to identify. Tolkien's publisher was George Allen & Unwin of London (A&U). Houghton Mifflin of Boston and New York arranged to publish Tolkien's books in the United States. Houghton Mifflin printed sheets for the first edition from plates etched from a photo-enlargement of the Allen & Unwin first edition. For the second edition they imported sheets directly from A&U. However, they bound their own volumes, usually distinctly from their British counterparts. The American versions differed from the British in one respect crucial to the collectibles market: beyond the first printing, most of Houghton Mifflin's impressions did not identify which printing run they came out of or even a copyright date. This failure caused confusion in the collectibles market, as few people can identify the Houghton Mifflin second editions, which were extant from 1951 to 1966.

Very roughly, earlier printings are valued more than later. In particular, the first edition, with its different account of Riddles in the Dark, is in great demand. However, the fifth overall impression, or the first printing of the second edition, seems to be garnering prices as high as the British fourth printing, which was the cheapest and most common of the first edition printings. Later second edition printings are valued much less than first edition printings or the first printing of the second edition. The presence of the matching dust-jacket often doubles the value of any of these printings, particularly if it is in good shape. However, because the second American edition changes its binding color from printing to printing, they gain considerable charm displayed in array without their jackets.

The first edition

Houghton Mifflin published the first American edition of The Hobbit in spring of 1938 following its September, 1937 debut in the United Kingdom. For this first edition Houghton Mifflin printed the sheets in the United States. They chose to print it in a larger size and on heavier stock than Allen & Unwin's first edition, and they included four color plates of Tolkien's original artwork. Margins are ample and the typesetting well crafted for readability. The lettering on the tan cloth cover is printed in deep blue. The bowing hobbit emblem on the front and the dwarf's hood emblem on the spine are filled with bright red. The end-paper maps were printed in red only, instead of the black and red chosen by Allen & Unwin. The publisher mistakenly put the Wilderland map in front and the Lonely Mountain map in back, the reverse of the description in the text.

Surviving dust-jackets on the first edition are rare. It is not known whether that is because of attrition, because some printings were not jacketed, or because lots directed to some markets did not come with jackets. What is known is that jackets have been reported on more than one of the printings and most commonly on the first printing. The jacket is a medium blue field all around. The front announces the title in white, beneath which appears, in color and framed in red, Tolkien's illustration of Hobbiton. The reverse displays Tolkien's illustration of Smaug on his trove, also in color.

A series of changes to the book suggest Houghton Mifflin printed the first edition several times. The earliest copies show the same bowing hobbit emblem on the title page as is visible on the cover, but in outline. The first printing appeared on March 1, 1938. This earliest printing also has no half-title page. At some point the publisher replaced the emblem on the title page with a seated flautist. The first two printings mistakenly identify Chapter VII as Chapter VI on page 118, a defect corrected in the third. The binding's cloth changes slightly in color and texture in step with other changes. The first printing's table of illustrations lists Thrór's map as the front endpaper, in accordance with the text (page 30) but contradicting the actual order. The later printings of the first edition list the Wilderland map as the front endpaper, in accordance with the actual order but contradicting the text.

(Regarding the bowing Hobbit emblem, some say the boots the hobbit wears conflicted with the text's description of a bare-footed hobbit, prompting the publisher to replace it. Yet the device comes directly from Tolkien's picture of Bilbo bowing to Smaug on his horde of treasure. Tolkien defended the boots to an astute reader by explaining that Bilbo had acquired them along the way.)

Hammond & Anderson refer to these variations as "states" within the "first printing", and recorded only two: one with the bowing hobbit on the title page, and one with the seated flautist. Houghton Mifflin's practice was to place the publication year at the foot of the title page for the first printings of its first editions. All first edition Hobbit copies, of all variations, with or without the bowing hobbit of the first printing, show "1938" as the date on the title page, perhaps discouraging bibliographers from ascribing different printings to them.

Other library bindings have been reported. A red library binding with yellow title and a simple geometric design in black, and including free-leaf maps, has been seen with the stamp "New Method Book Bindery", a company well known in the trade at the time (later becoming "Bound to Stay Bound Books Inc.").

All printings of the first edition measure 15.0 x 21.0 cm. They contain 310 numbered pages.

First edition identifier

†Note the explanation below: this is not the order the maps appear, but, rather, the order stated in the List of Illustrations. In all first editions the Wilderland map appears as the front paste-down. 
††Earliest confirmed date as seen in publisher's records, owner's inscriptions, or library stamps.

 emblem
 hobbit: Center of title page shows a bowing hobbit emblem.
 flautist: Center of title page shows a seated flautist emblem.
 half-title
 none: Volume has no half-title page.
 present: Volume has a half-title page.
 binding
 book cloth A: Yellowish-tan with slight greenish cast. Even color, tight weave in both directions.
 book cloth B: Neutral light tan, the lightest amongst the group. Tight weave.
 book cloth C: Slightly darker than book cloth B; very faint pinkish cast in some light. Even weave.
 book cloth D: Variegated darker tan, lacking any greenish or yellowish pall. Linen-like weave.
 book cloth E: Similar to book cloth A, but more intensely yellow.
 library: Deep orange with jacket design silk-screened in black.
 page 118
 Chapter VI: The chapter title is mislabeled.
 Chapter VII: The chapter title is correct.
 map order
 Thrór front: The List of Illustrations mistakenly states Thrór's map is the front endpaper.
 Thrór back: The List of Illustrations correctly states Thrór's map is the rear endpaper.
 map stock
 smooth: The paper the maps are printed on is smoothly calendered.
 rough: The paper the maps are printed on is no smoother than the text block.
 map leaves
 paste-down: The outside leaf of each map is pasted down onto the inside of the cover.
 free: The outside leaf of each map is a free leaf.
 type flaws
 clean
 None of the flaws listed below.
 broken A
 p. 193: Line 8, the "t" in "into" is broken.
 p. 193: Line 10, the "o" of "of" is broken.
 p. 205: Line 5, the "e" of "else" is broken.
 p. 237: Last paragraph, there may be spots of thin ink toward the left, especially the two (s)s of "darkness" as well as "the" below.
 broken B
 All of broken A plus:
 p. 81: Line 16, the comma after "blade," is light, and so is the opt left of the "o" just below.
 p. 119: Line 3, the "o" in "below" is broken at the bottom.
 p. 125: Line 4, the "o" in "to see" is broken at the bottom.
 p. 125: Line 13, the "ea" in "mean" is slightly clipped at the top.
 p. 145: Line 16, the "he" in the first "the" is lightened.
 broken B/C
 All of broken B plus:
 p. 213: Line 13, the right stem of "n" in "nor" is broken in the middle.
 p. 217: Line 1, the hump of the "h" in "the" has a hairline crack.
 broken C
 All of broken B/C plus:
 p. 17: Line 2, the upper half of the left stem of the "w" in "well" is lightened slightly.

The second edition

Basics

Tolkien began work on The Lord of the Rings in the years after The Hobbit's publication. As the story evolved, Tolkien realized he needed to change how Bilbo and Gollum interacted in The Hobbit to suit the plot of The Lord of the Rings. He also wrote a new version of the introductory note to explain an apparent discrepancy between the map saying that Thrain had been king under the mountain despite Thorin's father Thrain never having held that title. This was explained as the map referring to a distant ancestor, Thrain I. However, this introduced contradictions with the text, such as statements that Erebor had been founded in the time of Thorin's grandfather, thus precluding an ancient Thrain I having ruled there, which were eventually addressed with changes for the third edition.  Allen & Unwin prepared a new edition of The Hobbit for release in 1951, and Houghton Mifflin followed suit. These American impressions from the 5th through the 14th were bound from sheets printed in Great Britain, corresponding to the same George Allen & Unwin printings of the second edition. Unlike the AU printings, the American copies do not state the printing until the 18th in the second edition, making them very difficult to identify in isolation. The only exceptions are the 11th, 12th, and one of the two variants of the 5th impression, each of which states the full printing history. The following list of "points" was developed by Strebe by comparing unknown American printings to known British printings. Steve Frisby untangled the 9th printing, which differs from its Allen & Unwin counterpart on page 315. (This divergence likely resulted from the cancel title pages AU was obliged to supply when they converted 9th printing sheets intended for British domestic use into Houghton Mifflin sets.) Information regarding the print run sizes of the Second American Edition of the Hobbit is held by the University of Reading Special Collections Service.

The American second editions from the 5th through 14th printings measure 12.7 x 19.0 cm, contain 315 numbered pages, and have end-paper maps printed in black, white, and red. The frontispiece is printed in color, but the remaining color plates of the first edition have been eliminated. With the exception of the 5th printing, the cover design is similar to the American first edition, only smaller, differently colored, and lacking the bowing hobbit emblem on the front board. Both variants of the 5th printing, on the other hand, are bound identically to the British printings, with the only distinction being the notation "Houghton Mifflin Company" at the base of the book's spine.

Printing runs

The following table lists the printing dates, export dates, and number of sheets exported from George Allen & Unwin to Houghton Mifflin across the second edition, as determined from George Allen & Unwin records. The Stated date is the date listed in the corresponding UK impression's printing history on the copyright page.

5th printing variants
Houghton Mifflin issued two distinct variants corresponding to the British 5th printing.

The earlier variant (5a) is constructed in a similar style to the subsequent American printings of the second edition. That is, the title page states "Houghton Mifflin Company - Boston, The Riverside Press - Cambridge", and the book lacks the printing history and colophon entirely.  Even so, the sheets for the text body came from A&U and thus are identical to the British 5th printing.

The later variant (5b) is identical to the British 5th printing in every regard except for the "Houghton Mifflin" notation at the base of the spine. In particular, the title page states "London, George Allen & Unwin Ltd, Museum Street"; the colophon shows the A&U St. George and the Dragon insignia and the addresses of the publishers offices worldwide; and the title page verso shows the full printing history.

Dust-jackets
American second edition dust-jackets are nearly identical to British, except that Houghton Mifflin is printed at the bottom of the spine instead of George Allen Unwin. The design is basically unchanged from the original 1937 edition of The Hobbit. Dust-jackets declare the impression and often may be used to ascertain at least the approximate printing of the book. Sometimes, however, the publisher put dust-jackets from one printing onto books of a neighboring printing. Also lost, damaged or discarded dust-jackets are sometimes replaced with ones acquired elsewhere. Hence the jacket cannot be considered definitive.

Collation

The 5th and 6th impression signature marks are at the bottom center:
[B] on page 17, henceforth incrementing one letter every 16 pages.
[*] on page 307.

The 7th, 8th, and 9th impression signature marks start with [B] on page 17, henceforth incrementing one letter every 32 pages.
[*] on page 307.

Signature marks change on the 10th impression: [A*] at the bottom of the Table of Contents; [B] at bottom left of page 33 etc. These signature marks remain unchanged through the 14th impression.

Paper
Paper weight varies from printing to printing. Generally the earlier impressions are thinner than the later. Measurements exclude the binding and end papers; they start from the half-title page and extend to the last story page. The leaves should be pressed tightly when measuring. Measurements are rounded to the nearest half millimeter.

Binding

The 5th through 14th impressions come in a variety of colors. Generally all the books from one printing are bound in the same color, but exceptions may have been found, perhaps when bindings intended for one printing were left over and found use at the beginning of the next printing. Hence the color of the covers cannot conclusively identify a book.

Advertisements

Commencing with the 7th impression, the final page of the story advertises The Lord of the Rings. The distance between the advertisement and the main body of the text varies from impression to impression. Here the distance is measured from the baseline of the last line of the story's text down to the baseline of the first line of the advertisement.

 The 5th impression advertises Farmer Giles of Ham on the reverse of the half-title page.
 The 6th impression advertises The Lord of the Rings on the reverse of the half-title page but not on the last page of the text. 
 The 6th through 13th impressions advertise Farmer Giles of Ham and Lord of the Rings* on the reverse of the half-title page.
 The 14th impression advertises The Adventures of Tom Bombadil, Farmer Giles of Ham, and Lord of the Rings on the reverse of the half-title page.
 The 15th impression of the Allen & Unwin British edition advertises The Adventures of Tom Bombadil, Farmer Giles of Ham, (The) Lord of the Rings, and Tree and Leaf on the reverse of the half-title page. Houghton Mifflin probably did not issue a printing from these sheets.

* The advertisement for The Lord of the Rings on the half-title page is missing 'The' until the 24th printing.

Printing flaws
Starting with the 7th impression, the first "o" on page 22 is broken at 5:00 o'clock.

The 13th impression, on the bottom of page 315, displays an illegible "ab" in "you will learn a lot more 'about them". The 7th through 12th impressions, on the other hand, are clean. The illegible "ab" persists throughout remaining printings of the second edition, both British and American.

Later printings of second edition

Houghton Mifflin enlarged the book to 14.0 x 21.0 cm commencing with the 15th printing, probably in 1964. At that point they abandoned importing sheets from George Allen and Unwin. Parallel to the single British 15th printing, Houghton Mifflin reprinted The Hobbit nine times from their own plates until the advent of the third edition. They dropped the red color from the maps and removed the color frontispiece so that no color remained in the book's interior. The 15th and remaining printings of the second edition are bound in light green with lettering in dark blue. Beginning with the 18th impression the volumes state the printing number on the reverse of the title page. The 23rd impression is the final impression of the second edition.

The 24th printing belongs to the third edition: it replaces the second edition's description of the revised edition with a description of runes; the type is completely reset; and the page count increases to 317.

While the Allen and Unwin sheets appear to have been printed from Linotype plates, clues suggest that Houghton Mifflin opted to filmset the later printings of the second edition. They did not phototypeset new plates; rather they seem to have photographed the 14th impression. While the sheets are larger, the type block itself is identical. All the print surface flaws that the Allen and Unwin plates had accumulated up to that point were faithfully reproduced in film for the remaining printings. Because any number of copies of the film can be made and stored for future use, the type does not degrade from printing to printing the way it would with Linotype. If the film tears or loses its crispness, it may simply be replaced with a duplicate. Indeed, the 23rd impression's type block is effectively identical.

By settling on a single binding color and dropping all color from the interior, Houghton Mifflin cheapened later printings of the second edition, making them less 'collectible'.

The third edition

In 1965, finding a grey area in copyright law and irregularities in Houghton Mifflin's copyright and import compliance, publisher Ace Books issued a paperback edition of The Lord of the Rings against Tolkien's wishes. Already aware of potential copyright weakness and now having learned of Ace's plans, that same year George Allen & Unwin asked Tolkien to prepare a list of revisions to The Hobbit and The Lord of the Rings so that their copyrights could be renewed. Several dozen short changes were then introduced in the next few impressions of The Hobbit, starting with the 24th printing in 1966 and being complete by 1968. These changes were primarily minor stylistic variations (e.g. "They hadn't been riding..." to "They had not been riding...") and revisions to bring the story more in line with Tolkien's latest ideas about the broader mythology of his Middle-earth stories. Collectively, these changes are considered the third edition. The printings of the standard third edition are not marked as such. Instead, they list their printing on the reverse of the title page in the original succession dating all the way back to first UK printing. They are bound identically to the later printings of the second edition. The first impression of the third edition is the one marked as the 24th printing with a copyright date of 1966. Second editions contain the original description of the revised edition, beginning with, "In this reprint several minor inaccuracies...". The third edition's foreword, on the other hand, describes the runic characters seen on the maps and in the text. It commences with, "This is a story of long ago." Also, third editions contain 317 numbered pages, as compared to the 315 of the second edition.

Other known English-language editions

 English language edition annotated for Russian students of English. 
 BCA Publishing edition of 1992. Quarterbound with gilded lettering on spine and raised ribbing.
 Alan Lee illustrations, 60th anniversary edition, 1997
 HarperCollins Alan Lee illustrations, 2000, published for Dealerfield Ltd. Pictorial laminated boards. Almost certainly just a variant of 1997 Alan Lee.
 Michael Hague illustrations, hardcover
 Unwin 4th edition
 Del Rey paperback with cover matched to Peter Jackson's films
 1999 HarperCollins DeLuxe edition
 "Collins Modern Classics", Title on front shifted left of center
 Thorndike Press Large Print Basic Series, 483 pages.
 Unwin early 80s mass-market paperback with Smaug on his hoard, "The Hobbit" over a rust-colored background rectangle
 Harper Collins Limited Editions Collectors' Box with CD, fold-out map, etc. 2000.
 Unwin Hyman 1987 50th anniversary
 Black softcover with red dragon at bottom on front and runes in circle in middle
 Ballantine 1987 paperback 50th anniversary edition (with or without 50th anniversary note); Bilbo and Gollum on cover, cover illustration by Michael Herring.
 Ballantine 1978 film art edition, softcover edition of HA1977 Rankin/Bass animation.
 Late 1990s Ballantine softcover with "natural" scene of Gandalf in foreground, bridge in background, river flowing to foreground, forest on the right.
 3D pop-up edition illustrated by John Howe 
 Houghton Mifflin hardcover 4th edition, 255 pages, with Tolkien illustrations, but dust jacket shows Smaug on his hoard and vases, cups, and chalices in the foreground.
 1970 The Hobbit "Pleasure in Reading" edition. 279 pages. Australian edition? Complete?
 Ballantine paperback edition with "The Greatest Epic Fantasy of Our Time" on green background; Gandalf approaching Bag End; 305 pages.
 1972 English edition printed in Taiwan. 
 Newer version of EB1990 with new cover art

References

Further reading
 

Hobbit